Wandisa Guida (born 21 April 1935) is an Italian former film, stage and television actress. She was sometimes credited as Wandisa Leigh.
 
Born in Trani, Guida took part in the Miss Italia beauty contest in 1954, winning the title of Miss Cinema. She then moved to Rome to attend the Centro Sperimentale di Cinematografia, and after the graduation she appeared in dozens of genre films, sometimes starring in the main roles.

Partial filmography 

Miss Eurooppaa metsästämässä (1955) - Miss Italy (uncredited)
Incatenata dal destino (1956) - Letizia grande
I colpevoli (1957)
I Vampiri (1957) - Laurette Robert
C'è un sentiero nel cielo (1957) - Marisa
Serenate per 16 bionde (1957) - Christine
La trovatella di Pompei (1957) - Luisa
La canzone più bella (1957) - Elena Serventi
Dinanzi a noi il cielo (1957)
Toto and Marcellino (1958) - La maestra
Il Conte di Matera (1958) - Gisella Bressi, sorella di Paolo
Quando gli angeli piangono (1958)
I prepotenti (1958) - Marcella Pinelli
An Italian in Greece (1958) - Wandisa Vanzi
Carosello di canzoni (1958)
Knight Without a Country (1959)
Il padrone delle ferriere (1959) - Athenaïs de Moulinet
I mafiosi (1959) - Odette
Re Lear (1960) - Cordelia
Goliath and the Dragon (1960) - Alcinoe
The Revolt of the Slaves (1960) - Agnese
Cavalcata selvaggia (1960)
Capitani di ventura (1961) - Duchess Belinda
The Prisoner of the Iron Mask (1961) - Christina
Revenge of the Conquered (1961) - Princess Irina
The Vengeance of Ursus (1961) - Sira
Gladiator of Rome (1962) - Nisa
Gli eroi del doppio gioco (1962) - Luciana Riccio
Jacob and Esau (1963) - Guiditta - Judith
Hercules Against Rome (1964) - Ulpia
Maciste in King Solomon's Mines (1964) - Fazira
Giants of Rome (1964) - Livilla
Adventures of the Bengal Lancers (1964) - Mary Stark
Secret Agent Fireball (1965) - Elena
Bob Fleming... Mission Casablanca (1966) - Terry Coleman
Lightning Bolt (1966) - Kary
Scorpion with Two Tails (1982) - Heather Hull (final film role)

References

External links 

 

1935 births
Italian film actresses
Italian stage actresses
Italian television actresses
People from Trani
Italian beauty pageant winners
Centro Sperimentale di Cinematografia alumni
Living people